The Turtle Island (Foochow Romanized: Gŭi-dō̤) is an island in Beigan Township, Lienchiang County, Taiwan.

Geology
The island composes of granite rock which rises above sea water level. Its cracked surface makes it look like a gigantic turtle resting in the sea.

Gallery

See also
 List of tourist attractions in Taiwan
 List of islands of Taiwan

References

Beigan Township
Geography of Lienchiang County
Islands of Taiwan
Tourist attractions in Lienchiang County